General elections were held in Western Samoa on 5 April 1991. Following a referendum the previous year, they were the first under universal suffrage, although candidates still had to be members of the Matai. The result was a victory for the Human Rights Protection Party, which won 27 of the 47 seats.

Results

See also
List of members of the Legislative Assembly of Western Samoa (1991–1996)

References

Western Samoa
General
Elections in Samoa
Election and referendum articles with incomplete results